Heracles Chariot Racing is a racing game by Neko Entertainment originally released for PlayStation 2 in 2007. It was later released as a WiiWare game in North America and PAL regions in July 2009. PSP version was released through the PlayStation Network store as a downloadable title in December the same year.

Gameplay
Players control Heracles or one of a number of characters from Greek mythology (such as Poseidon, Medusa and the Minotaur) in a series of horseless chariot races for the honor of being crowned the Champion Charioteer without a horse. In addition to picking up items to aid themselves, players can also hinder their opponents by using weaponry such as tridents, fireballs and Zeus' lightning in order to try trip them up.

The game features a Championship mode consisting of 3 cups with 10 tracks spread across 5 mythical environments (including Mount Olympus and Hades), as well as single race and Battle modes. The game features split-screen multiplayer for up to 4 players across all modes.

References

External links
 Neko Entertainment page (PS2 version)

2007 video games
PlayStation 2 games
PlayStation Network games
PlayStation Portable games
WiiWare games
Racing video games
Wii games
Neko Entertainment games
Vehicular combat games
Video games developed in France
Video games based on Greek mythology
Multiplayer and single-player video games